Rainer von Fieandt's  cabinet was the 42nd government of Republic of Finland. Cabinet's time period was from November 29, 1957 to April 26, 1958. It was a caretaker government. Cabinet fell by interpellation of the opposition and it is up to date (2021) the last Finnish government to do so.

Von Fieandt
1957 establishments in Finland
1958 disestablishments in Finland
Cabinets established in 1957
Cabinets disestablished in 1958